Sir Edmund Plowden (1590 – July 1659 in Lydbury North, Shropshire, England) also titled Lord Earl Palatinate, Governor and Captain-General of the Province of New Albion in North America was an explorer and colonial governor who attempted to colonize North America in the mid-seventeenth century under a grant for a colony to be named New Albion.  This attempt, fraught with mutiny, legal woes, lack of funds, and bad timing and compromised by Plowden's ill-temper, was a failure, and Plowden returned to England in 1649.

Biography
The grandson of the eminent jurist, Edmund Plowden (1515–1585), Sir Edmund Plowden was born in 1590 to Francis Plowden (1562–1652) of Shiplake Court in Oxfordshire and Wokefield Park in Berkshire and his wife, Mary Fermor.  Plowden married Mabel Marriner (1596–1674) in 1609.

References

Edward C. Carter II and Clifford Lewis III "Sir Edmund Plowden and the New Albion Charter, 1632-1785" in The Pennsylvania Magazine of History and Biography (April 1959).
Clifford Lewis III. "Some Extracts Relating to Sir Edmund Plowden and Others from the Lost Minutes of the Virginia Council and General Court: 1642-1645" and "Some Notes on Sir Edmund Plowden's Attempts to Settle His Province of New Albion" in William and Mary Historical Quarterly (January 1940).
Charles Varlo The Grant of King Charles the First, to Sir Edmund Plowden, Earl Palatine of Albion, of the Province of New Albion, in America, June 21, A.D., 1634 (1785) (Collection of the New York Public Library).

External links
Plowden Family Website: The Descendants of Edmund Plowden I

People of colonial New Jersey
People of colonial Pennsylvania
People of colonial Maryland
1590 births
1659 deaths
People from Shiplake
People from West Berkshire District
English emigrants